The Gunma Crane Thunders are a professional basketball team that compete in the first division of the Japanese B.League. They are based in Ōta, Gunma. It is said that the shape of Gunma Prefecture resembles the shape of a dancing crane. The team's name is a combination of the crane and lightning, which evokes images of "energy" and "speed".

Coaches
Tadashi Hayashi (2012)
Ryan Blackwell (2012–13)
Hiroki Fujita (2013
Charlie Parker (2014–15)
Hirokazu Nema (2015–16)
Fujitaka Hiraoka (2016–21)
Thomas Wisman (2021–22)
Kota Mizuno (2022–present)

Roster

Notable players

Trey Britton
Deividas Busma
Darko Čohadarević
Marcus Cousin
Melvin Ely
Gary Hamilton
Thomas Kennedy
Abdullahi Kuso
Kenneth Simms
Dillion Sneed
Ryan Stephan
Noriyuki Sugasawa
Patrick Sullivan
Hirohisa Takada
Scootie Randall

Arenas
Ota Citizens Gymnasium
Yamato Citizens Gymnasium Maebashi
Yamada Green Dome Maebashi
Kiryu University Green Arena
Kakinuma Arena
Isesaki Citizens Gymnasium

References

 
Basketball teams in Japan
Sports teams in Gunma Prefecture
Basketball teams established in 2011
2011 establishments in Japan